Parchi is a 2018 Pakistani Urdu-language crime comedy film directed by Azfar Jafri and produced by Imran Kazmi and Arif Lakhani under the banner IRK Films. The film stars Hareem Farooq, Ali Rehman Khan and Shafqat Cheema, with Ahmed Ali Akbar, Faiza Saleem, Shafqat Khan and Usman Mukhtar in supporting roles. Khan also wrote film whilst Usman Mukhtar managed cinematography; Farooq also produced the film. It was released and distributed by ARY Films on 5 January 2018.

Cast

Hareem Farooq as Eman
Ali Rehman Khan as Bash
Shafqat Cheema as Zodiac
Ahmed Ali Akbar as Saqlain
Usman Mukhtar as Bilal
Shafqat Khan as Bhola
Faiza Saleem as Sumera
Faizan Shaikh as Biscuit
Mahenur Haider as Natasha
Mojiz Hasan as Virgo

Production

Development and casting
In March 2016; producer Imran Kazmi in an interview with The Express Tribune revealed that his production team had begun with the film's pre-production, and with the intention to begin shooting for the film in October 2016. He confirmed that the script had been finalised. He also told that he would be co-producing with Hareem Farooq who will also play as one of the leads in the film alongside Ali Rehman and Usman Mukhtar.

Filming
Some of the filming for the film was done in Islamabad in the outskirts of the city. A night scene was shot in an old factory of an industrial zone, in very late hours of the night. Usman Mukhtar who in addition plays one of the lead characters in the film, managed the cinematography of the film.

Release
The film's trailer was released on 2 December 2017 and the film released across Pakistan on 5 January 2018. Parchi was the first Pakistani movie to be released in Saudi cinemas.

Box office
The film ended its run at  worldwide.

Reception

Critical reception
The film was premiered in Karachi on 3 January 2018. Iman Zia of MangoBaaz said, "while it isn't an entire failure, the film is not as forgettable as I had expected". Shahjehan Saleem of Something Haute rated 2.5 out of 5 stars and said, "Sadly its shortcomings let it down […] If the film has one thing going for it, it's the acting." Sonia Ashraf of DAWN Images and said, "Parchi is not a film without flaws but it has some redeemable qualities that make it worth a watch." Shahjahan Khurram of Samaa TV rated 2 out of 5 stars and said, "there were flashes of commendable performance in the flick but by and large, it failed to fire on all cylinders." Buraq Shabbir of The News International said, "The good thing is that Parchi has been shot very well, with good camera work and an exciting cast but unfortunately it falls flat in terms of plot and character development."

Rahul Aijaz of The Express Tribune rated 2.5 out of 5 stars and said, "Even with a lot going on in its favour, it's a forgettable film." For Daily Times, Haider Rifaat rated 4 out of 5 stars and praised it, "The fun driven film is a family entertainer for sure and manages to tease and thrill simultaneously." Saira Agha praised its cinematography but said, "Good actors cannot save a bad film and the same fate is met by Parchi." Ally Adnan praised only 3 actors, while he wrote that "Parchi will not blow anyone's mind"; adding "the 'Mummy Daddy Burger Film' genre does not consider originality and innovation to be a virtue" and it too borrows the ideas from "more than 20 films". Umair Sohail of Dunya News rated 3 out of 5 stars and said that it is "a full-on comedy movie".

Music

References

External links

Soundtrack on Saavn

2010s crime comedy films
Pakistani adventure comedy films
2010s adventure comedy films
Films scored by Manj Musik
2018 comedy films
Films directed by Azfar Jafri